Benny Prasad (born 6 August 1975) is a gospel musician and instrumental guitarist from India. He designed the Bentar which is the world's first bongo guitar. He also holds the world record for being the fastest man ever to visit all the 245 nations (194 Sovereign, 51 Dependent nations including Antarctica) in the world. 

Prasad has traveled all around the world performing to audiences. He has performed before presidents and parliaments, before the crowds of 2007 military world games, 2006 FIFA world cup and the 2004 Olympic games. 

Prasad has also won renown by designing two guitars – the world's first bongo guitar and a 54 string guitar, the bentar.

He had traveled to all these countries in 6 years, 6 months and 22 days (from 1 May 2004 to 22 November 2010), and is therefore the fastest man ever to visit all 257 countries in the world.

Early life
Born on 6 August 1975, in Bangalore, India, Benny Prasad studied in Kendriya Vidyalaya National Aerospace Laboratories. His father, a scientist at the National Aerospace Laboratories, spent a lot of time trying to drill mathematics and science into Benny. He was expected to excel in his studies and to set an example for his younger brother and sisters.

Soon Benny excelled in forgery and expertise in the art of lying, having a fiery and explosive temper. As a young person he developed severe asthma which required him to take cortisone steroids and resulted in rheumatoid arthritis, 60% lung damage and a weakened immune system. Finding no fulfillment in life, Benny soon became depressed and his behavior continued to worsen and he attempted suicide at the age of 16. Benny's mother convinced him to go to a retreat center.

Benny joined Youth with a Mission (YWAM) and completed a Discipleship Training School (DTS) and School of Biblical Studies (SBS) in Bangalore, India. After completing a School of Music in Missions (SOMM) in New Mexico, USA and a School of Events Management (SEM) in Townsville, Australia, Benny received an Associate of Arts degree through YWAM's University of the Nations.

Benny says, 'If I could be made useful, anyone in this world can. If my dreams can come true, yours can too. My sin and shame has been exchanged for righteousness and new life by the Almighty GOD JESUS CHRIST to set me free.'

Timeline

Soon after graduation Benny was invited to perform as a guest artist at the Orchid Festival in Singapore where the President of Singapore was the chief guest.
In 2003 Benny graduated from the University of the Nations. The graduation was held in Singapore in Sept. 2003.
26 Dec 2004 – Benny performed at the Christmas Celebrations at the 100 ft Christmas Tree in the heart of Singapore on Orchard Road. In fact Benny recalls that this was a last minute invitation which Benny accepted. Due to this event he postponed his flight to Sri Lanka/ Bangalore. Because he was supposed to stay in the hotel on the beach in Colombo on the 26th and it was the same day the tsunami hit.
In Sept 2004 Benny was invited as the guest Artist to perform at the Disability Conference by Joni Eareckson Tada.
Sept 2004 – Benny performed at the Viking's Festival in Norway
In 2004, Benny performed at the 2004 Olympic Games in Greece. He performed for the Welcoming of the South African Athletes & Delegates, as well as at the Cultural Stages and the Museum for the Press Conference (Delirious).
Sept 2005 Benny performed on the Centre stage at the Mitad del Mundo (Middle of the Earth) in Ecuador on the equator.
June 2005 – Benny performed at the Palm Creek Folk Festival in Australia.
In April 2005 Benny was invited by Mr. Young Vivian, the Premier of Niue to come and play in the Parliament. In May the same year, he was also invited to perform for the Cabinet of the North Mariana Islands.
In Nov 2006 Benny performed with the instrumentalist, Pedro Eustache at the Nations to Nations Celebration in Amsterdam. 
In July 2006 Benny performed at various cultural stages at the Fifa World Cup in Germany including this one which was one of the official stages for the launch in Iserlohn.
In June 2006 Benny spoke in some of the classes in Liberty University, USA as well as performed at the Convocation
In Feb. 2006 Benny was awarded as one of the ten stalwarts of the 25 years of Kendriya Vidyalaya NAL School. He was felicitated by Sri V. Mahadevan, Chairman of Indian Satellite Research Organisation (ISRO). Benny spoke to the audience saying that it was the same school that he was called useless and worthless for the nine years he studied there. He gives the credit and glory to God for redeeming his past.
Jan 2006 Benny entered into the Limca Book of Records as the "Most traveled Indian Musician"
On 14 October 2007 Benny performed in Hyderabad at the Opening Ceremony of the Military World Games.
In July 2007 Benny performed at Indus in Bangkok organized by Artists Society. One of them who attended was Rabe'e Oskoee, an Iranian Comedian/Actress.
In Feb 2007 Benny did a 22-nation Caribbean Tour and performed in Anguilla in front of the Governor Andrew Neil George. He also performed and shared to the Ministry of Justice in Haiti.
In Jan 2008 Benny performed as well as spoke to the Ministry of Education in Bermuda.
In Jan 2008 Benny was also given an Hon. Doctorate for designing his guitar (BENTAR) as well as for his travels as a musician.
In 2010 he made the world record for fastest man to visit 245 countries.
 
Benny currently lives in Bangalore, India. He is a member of the First Assembly of God Church.

Discography
 I Surrender All (2000)
 In Moments Like These (2002)
 When the Music Fades (2004)
 Tribute to the Unknown God (2008)

References

External links

1975 births
Living people
Indian guitarists
Kendriya Vidyalaya alumni
21st-century guitarists